Brazil, although at the time being commanded by a dictatorial regime sympathetic to the fascist model (the Estado Novo regime) of the Axis countries, ended up participating in World War II (1939-1945) on the side of the Allied forces. In February 1942, German and Italian submarines torpedoed Brazilian ships in the Atlantic Ocean in retaliation for Brazil's adherence to the commitments of the Atlantic Charter (which provided for automatic alignment with any nation of the American continent that was attacked by an extra-continental power), making its neutrality only theoretical.

Overview 
In 1942, amidst economic incentives and diplomatic pressure, the Americans installed aircraft bases along the Brazilian North-Northeast coast. After months of torpedoing Brazilian merchant ships (21 German and 2 Italian submarines were responsible for the sinking of 36 Brazilian merchant ships, causing 1,691 shipwrecks and 1,074 deaths, which was the main reason that led to Brazil's declaration of war on Germany and Italy), the people took to the streets and the Brazilian government declared war on Nazi Germany and Fascist Italy in August 1942.

At the time, Brazil was a country with an illiterate majority of the population living in rural areas. The country had an economy mainly focused on commodity exports and a traditionally isolationist international policy with eventual automatic alignments against "disturbers of the international order and trade". Without an industrial, medical and educational infrastructure that could serve as material and human support to the war, not only was Brazil prevented from pursuing an autonomous course of action in the conflict, the country found it difficult to assist the smallest of efforts. The Brazilian Expeditionary Force, for instance, had its formation defined at the Potenji River Conference, soon after the Casablanca Conference, but its creation was postponed for a year after the declaration of war.

Their deployment to the front started in July 1944, almost two years after the declaration. Around 25,000 men were sent, out of the 100,000 initially planned. Although having problems with preparation and deployment, already in Italy, trained and equipped by the Americans, the Brazilian Expeditionary Force fulfilled the main missions assigned to it by the allied command.

History

Predecessors 

In February 1942, German and Italian submarines began torpedoing Brazilian vessels in the Atlantic Ocean in retaliation, according to Goebbels' diaries, for Brazil's adherence to the commitments of the Atlantic Charter (which provided for automatic alignment with any nation of the American continent that was attacked by an extra-continental power).

Of great importance for the Brazilian government to gradually align itself with the United States and, consequently, with the allied cause, after Pearl Harbor, were: The veiled attempts of interference in Brazilian internal affairs by Germany and Italy, especially from the implementation of the Estado Novo; the progressive impossibility, from the end of 1940, of maintaining stable and effective trade relations with these countries due to British and later American naval pressure; and the so-called good neighbor policy practiced by then-President Franklin D. Roosevelt, who, among other economic and commercial incentives, financed the construction of a steel mill, the Companhia Siderúrgica Nacional (CSN). According to reports at the time, the United States had plans to invade the Northeast region of Brazil (Plan Rubber) if Getúlio Vargas insisted on maintaining the country's neutrality.

During 1942, after the proposals made by the United States to finance the construction of CSN, among other proposals to help the national economy, the Americans installed aircraft bases along the Brazilian North-Northeast coast. The most important of these was in the city of Parnamirim, near the capital Natal, in the state of Rio Grande do Norte. This base, called "Trampoline of Victory", was of special importance to the Allied war effort before the Anglo-American troops landed in North Africa in November 1942, in Operation Torch. From the stabilization of the Italian front in late 1943 and the weakening of the German submarine campaign, the American bases on Brazilian soil were progressively deactivated throughout 1944-45, although the Americans remained on the island of Fernando de Noronha until 1960.

Brazilian ships sunk 

In World War II, the attacks on the ships of the Brazilian merchant navy by Axis submarines, between 1941 and 1944, caused the death of more than a thousand people and precipitated Brazil's entry into the conflict, which, until then, had remained neutral, alongside the allied forces. Thirty-five ships were attacked (32 were sunk) in the waters of the Atlantic (including the Mediterranean Sea) and Indian Ocean; from Philadelphia in the United States to the Cape of Good Hope in South Africa. The other attacks occurred after Brazil broke diplomatic relations with the Axis, on January 28, 1942.

The attacks reached their peak in August 1942, when, in only two days, six ships were sunk, causing the death of more than 600 people, leading Brazil to declare war to the Axis on August 21.

In 1943, despite a considerable improvement in patrolling and anti-submarine warfare systems from joint Brazilian and American operations, the Axis "u-boats" were still attacking throughout the South Atlantic, at which time several ships - domestic and foreign - were sunk, especially off the coasts of São Paulo and Rio de Janeiro. Most of the vessels were merchant or mixed (cargo and passenger ships), and belonged to big shipping companies of the time - Lloyd Brasileiro, Lloyd Nacional, and Costeira. Ships from other small companies were also attacked, as well as vessels belonging to small regional shipowners and seafarers, such as the barge Jacira and the fishing boat Shangri-lá. Lloyd Brasileiro, the largest of these companies, arguably lost the most ships and crew members: There were 21 vessels attacked, of which 19 were sunk.

During the conflict, among warships, the Brazilian Navy suffered only one loss, with the sinking of the auxiliary ship Vital de Oliveira (also the last Brazilian ship to be torpedoed in World War II), on July 19, 1944, when it was heading to Rio de Janeiro, after stops in the Northeast and Espírito Santo. Besides the Vital de Oliveira, the Brazilian Navy would lose, for other reasons, two more military ships in World War II: the corvette Camaquã, which capsized on July 21, 1944, when 23 crew members died; and the cruiser Bahia, which accidentally exploded and sank on July 4, 1945, killing 333 men. The Cabedelo and the Shangri-lá were the two ships that did not survive.

"Atlantic Belt" 
With the Suez Canal blocked, and with the need for essential raw materials such as rubber and tin from Malaysia in the East, the Germans and Italians used the Atlantic Ocean as a route to maintain their arms industry. Initially, it was their cruisers and large cargo ships that made the long voyage across the Atlantic and Indian Oceans. As the risk of losing ships with great war potential became high due to blockades by the Allies, the Axis began to use submarines and "blockade runners" (armed vessels disguised as merchant vessels, neutral or allied).

To try to hinder such influx of raw material to the enemy forces, the "Atlantic Belt", the name given to the narrowest stretch between South America and Africa, was strengthened, precisely, the straight line from Natal to Dakar, with a length of 1,700 miles. The Brazilian end of the "Atlantic Belt" was what the Allies called the "Northeast Ridge", the northeastern portion of Brazilian territory closest to Africa and the European stage of war. For this to happen, bases had to be installed in Brazil, which began in mid-June 1941, when Task Force No. 3 arrived and the ports of Recife and Salvador were cleared for use by the US Navy. In turn, the Axis wished to interrupt the shipment of raw materials to the United States and the shipment of supplies to England, thus beginning the attack on merchant vessels sailing through the Atlantic.

Beginning of hostilities 

On March 22, the merchant ship Taubaté was attacked by a German aircraft in the Mediterranean, off the Egyptian coast. In the episode, Brazil had its first war casualty, the gate clerk José Francisco Fraga. On June 13, a German submarine stopped the merchant ship Siqueira Campos, which was near the Cape Verde archipelago, with cannon fire, and only released it after inspecting it. Since 1940, Brazilian ships had already been seized three times: (the Siqueira Campos, the Buarque, and the Itapé) by the British, under different pretexts, especially for transporting goods and/or passengers of German origin. On January 18, 1941, the French merchant ship Mendoza was captured in safety zone waters off the Brazilian coast by a British auxiliary cruiser. This incident led the Brazilian government to issue a protest note to the British government. Despite these minor incidents, with the rupture of diplomatic relations and the war spreading to the four corners of the world, the following years would prove to be the most tragic in the history of the Brazilian merchant marine.

The rupture of diplomatic relations and the bases given to the Americans in the Northeast made Brazil a hostile country in the view of the Germans and Italians, which placed it, in the words of the German Ambassador, Mr. Pruefer, "in a state of latent war" with the Axis. From then on, Brazilian ships began to be attacked off the American coast and in the Caribbean. The first was the Buarque (one killed) and the Olinda (no casualties), on February 15 and 18, 1942, respectively. The most emblematic case of that month, and also the most tragic until then, was the "disappearance" of the Cabedelo, somewhere in the Atlantic Ocean, east of the Caribbean Sea, after setting sail from the United States on February 14, when the submarine offensive was at its peak in the region. Fifty-four men died and to this day it is not known who sank the ship. The most likely hypothesis is that it was the Italian submarine Da Vinci, but there is no definitive proof. The possibility that the Cabedelo was torpedoed by other Italian submarines: the Torelli or the Capellini has also been considered. The date of the sinking of this ship is also controversial. Some sources consider the day of the sinking to be the 14th, the day the United States left. Others attest that the ship was sunk on February 25.

By the end of July, Brazil would still lose:

 The SS Arabutan (one dead).
 The Cairu (fifty-three dead).
 The Parnaíba (seven dead).
 The Gonçalves Dias (six dead).
 The Alegrete (no casualties).
 The Paracuri (no data on the number of people on board, or if there were casualties).
 The Pedrinhas (no casualties).
 The Tamandaré (four dead).
 The Barbacena (six dead).
 The Piave (one dead).

All of them were attacked far from the Brazilian coast, and, except for the Cairu, the number of casualties was not catastrophic. Many shipwrecks of national merchant ships were interrogated by commanders and crew of the German U-boats, interested in the voyages of other vessels and the cargoes taken to the United States.

Attacks in the South Atlantic 
On May 18, the first attack in the South Atlantic basin, close to national waters, was made by the Italian submarine Barbarigo, of which Commander Lira was a victim, and which caused two deaths. The ship, though torpedoed and cannonaded, did not sink. The episode served as another American diplomatic triumph: The ship was traveling from Recife to New Orleans when it was torpedoed 180 nautical miles off the Fernando de Noronha archipelago. The crew launched an SOS signal and abandoned the vessel, which was left burning after also being cannonaded by the Italian boat. The submarine pulled away, believing that its target would soon sink. But the SOS had been picked up by American ships, and on the morning of the 19th, the Commander Lira was boarded by sailors from the American cruiser USS Omaha that put out the fire. The sailors needed to steer the ship were taken back on board, and the Brazilian merchant was towed by the small American minesweaper USS Thrush, in conjunction with the Brazilian Navy tug Heitor Perdigão, to Fortaleza, where they arrived on the 25th. Two days after attacking Commander Lira, the Barbarigo thought it had sunk an American battleship. It was the cruiser Milwaukee that was not hit.

After these episodes, Barbarigo was attacked between the Rocas Atoll and Fernando de Noronha by a B-25 Mitchell bomber of the newly created Brazilian Air Force (FAB). The plane belonged to the Adaptation Aircraft Grouping, a training unit that the FAB had organized to receive planes from the United States. The crew of the B-25 was consequently American and Brazilian. Captain Affonso Celso Parreiras Horta was in command, and the other Brazilian officer on board was Captain Oswaldo Pamplona Pinto. The American pilot training them was First Lieutenant Henry B. Schwane of the US Army Air Force. This would be the first combat mission in the history of the FAB. 

At the same time, there were three other Italian submarines in action off the coast of the country: The Archimede, the Cappellini, and the Bagnolini. The first one attacked the convoy of Commander Lira and, although it did no damage. The captain of the submarine thought he had sunk a heavy cruiser, likely mistaking it for the detonation of a depth charge from the US destroyer Moffett. The events of that week were widely reported and the American president Franklin Delano Roosevelt congratulated Getúlio Vargas for the attacks.

By July, Brazil had lost 14 ships (not counting the Taubaté, machine-gunned the year before). The torpedoings that took place the following month, the work of only one Nazi submarine, U-507, caused indignation and consternation among the Brazilian public opinion, which would lead to the declaration of war against the Axis, formalized at the end of that month. On August 7, 1942, the German Submarine Command issued an order to the submarines in the South Atlantic, among them U-507, to attack all ships, except Argentine and Chilean, that sailed into Brazilian waters. Until then, the country was neutral, but in that month considerable US forces were already established in Northeast Brazil. Another sign of the end of neutrality was the attacks on Italian submarines in May, and the order to place cannons on merchant ships, which had been armed since May. Thus, in four days (between August 15 and 19), the U-507, sailing close to the coast and commanded by Captain Harro Schacht, sank five coasting ships and another small boat, between the coasts of Bahia and Sergipe, causing 607 casualties, of which, many women and children.

Many other attacks by enemy forces took place afterward, which also took many lives. They were: Baependi (270 killed), Araraquara (131 killed), Aníbal Benévolo (150 killed), Itagiba (36 dead), and Arará (20 dead).

Popular response 

In a matter of days, the number of dead had more than quadrupled from those since the beginning of the year (607 versus 135). Moreover, the other ships had generally been attacked far from the country; and their victims, for the most part, were sailors. Only seven passengers had died in the first 13 sinkings, 6 of them on the Cairu. The photos of the dead on the beaches, and the accounts of the survivors made the population realize that war had indeed come to the country. "Challenge and outrage to Brazil", was the headline of O Globo on the 18th of August. By then, the number of victims had already exceeded six hundred. Panic erupted among the population, especially those who needed to travel from one state to another. There were no highways or railroads connecting the regions of the country and crossing great distances. Civil aviation was incipient and there were virtually no airports.

For these people, one of the only and cheapest options available was to use ships. It was common for merchant ships to carry passengers, who took advantage of the stopovers to travel from one point to another in the country. Thus, any Brazilian family traveling by ship at that time ran the risk of being a victim of a submarine attack. And for those who lived on the coast of the Northeast, the war did not seem as distant a reality as it might have seemed to Brazilians in other regions. With time, the initial commotion and panic gave way to general indignation. In 1942 Rio de Janeiro, a series of marches and popular rallies were held, in which the population demanded retaliation; they headed to the Itamaraty Palace - headquarters of the Ministry of Foreign Affairs - clamoring for Chancellor Oswaldo Aranha, who exclaimed to the people:

The National Union of Students (UNE) organized marches in the main Brazilian cities, demanding that the country enter the war on the side of the Allies. In these marches, it was common for some students to dress up as Hitler, with the objective of ridiculing the Nazi dictator. These marches ended up receiving a large popular support, not only from university students but also from other sectors of the population, who also demanded war. This forced the reluctant government of Getúlio Vargas to enter the war. On August 22, after a ministerial meeting, Brazil declared a "state of belligerency" against Nazi Germany and Fascist Italy, formalized by Decree-Law 10,508, issued on August 31.

Controversial cases 
During the conflict, other Brazilian ships were shipwrecked, mostly by collision or stranding. Some cases, however, were never clarified, such as the disappearance of the Santa Clara, near Bermuda, on March 15, 1941, and the sinking of the Cisne Branco, on September 27, 1943. The sinking of the Cisne Branco is sometimes credited to the German submarine U-161, but, on the day of the sinking, this submarine was off the coast of Alagoas - approximately 750 km away - which rules out its participation in that event, although it is plausible that another submarine could have attacked that boat.

The Brazilian courts, in 2005, granted a survivor of the boat the right to receive the special pension for former combatants of World War II, assured in the Brazilian Constitution of 1988, although the court decision was based on the fact that the ship was involved in the war effort - the boat provided supply service for the Navy - and not that it was effectively torpedoed by enemy action. For this reason, the crew members killed in the sinking (the number varies between one and four) could not have their names inscribed on the Monument to the Dead of World War II. Regarding Santa Clara, it is known that the ship, on a voyage from New York to Rio de Janeiro, would have suffered an explosion on board, and that its crew had abandoned it. However, nothing but wreckage of the ship has been found. The crew and lifeboats were never located.

There is also mention of the sinking of two unidentified Brazilian vessels: One on June 5, 1942, in the Caribbean, sunk by U-159, together with the Brazilian sailboat Paracuri; and the other, sunk by U-507, on August 17 of the same year. Regarding the first one, it is probable that the unidentified vessel was the Honduran sailboat Sally, a small vessel of 150 tons, which was proven to have been torpedoed by the U-159. As for the second event, there was likely a mistake, as on August 17, 1942, according to official records, the U-507 sank two (and not three) ships: the Itagiba and the Arará, which were sunk almost simultaneously. The next Brazilian victim of the U-507 would be the small barge Jacira, which sunk two days later. It is plausible that the unidentified boat was one of those that came to the rescue of the double torpedoing, the yacht Aragipe and the schooner Deus do Mar, which were not attacked by the u-boat.

Demonstrations against immigrants from Axis countries 
After the sinking of the Brazilian ships and the high number of deaths, violent popular demonstrations against immigrants from the Axis countries, especially Germans, Japanese, and Italians, took place in several cities. There were many episodes of depredation of commercial establishments belonging to immigrants from countries that were part of the Axis - and even attempts to lynch such people. After Brazil entered the war, many of these immigrants began to be watched by Brazilian authorities as part of the conflicts involving the "home front" of the war. Brazil was the scene of intense espionage activity during the war, and many immigrants who did not speak Portuguese were considered suspects of espionage.

It was also in the midst of this process that newspapers and radio programs in the languages of the Axis countries were banned in Brazil. The Brazilian government created prisons for foreigners suspected of anti-Brazilian activities, which also served for prisoners coming from the crew of German vessels captured or damaged off the Brazilian coast. The Brazilian government's concern was linked to the Axis powers' use of the ties they had with immigrants and their Brazilian descendants, as countries like Germany, Italy, and Japan tried to mobilize and manipulate their emigrants in their favor in the war. War propaganda on the home front was successful to the point that in the Japanese case, after the end of the conflict, 80% of the 200,000 Japanese immigrants and descendants living in São Paulo believed that Japan had won the war.

Despite the existence of terrorist groups such as the Shindo Renmei that were active against the Brazilian government during World War II and executed Japanese immigrants favorable to Brazil; the intense activity of fascist groups favorable to the Axis countries; and the controversy regarding the arbitrariness with which immigrants were treated during the war, Japanese immigrants were better treated in Brazil than in other allied countries, such as the United States, where the approximately 120,000 Japanese immigrants, regardless of whether they were American citizens, were sent to concentration camps with precarious conditions.

At the time, German and Italian immigrant groups in Brazil spread rumors that American submarines were responsible for the attacks, to force Brazil to enter the war. According to historians, this was a rumor created by the war propaganda of the Axis collaborators infiltrating the Brazilian population, called the "Fifth Columns". There is ample documentation proving that German submarines were responsible for torpedoing most Brazilian ships during World War II. The main reason for the rumors is that the raw materials carried by Brazilian merchant ships were of vital importance to the Allies, making the Axis countries interested in attacking these ships. Moreover, at that time, most of the American submarine fleet was not in the Atlantic Ocean, but in the Pacific, torpedoing Japanese warships.

In this regard, Adm. Arthur Oscar Saldanha da Gama, ex-combatant and naval historian verified in the archives of the German Submarine Command the records of the sinking of Brazilian ships by their submarines, with respective names, positions and circumstances, thus dispelling any doubt about the authorship of the attacks. In all, 66 attacks by the Brazilian Navy on German submarines in the South Atlantic were recorded, resulting in damage to or the sinking of 18 submarines off the Brazilian coast, of which nine - the U-128, U-161, U-164, U-199, U-513, U-590, U-591, U-598 and the U-662 - were officially recorded by the German Navy as having been sunk by the Brazilian Navy. The German Navy also recorded the sinking of the Brazilian submarines.

Entry into the war 

Brazil entered the war through decree No. 10.358 of August 31, 1942, recognizing the state of war between Brazil and the Axis powers in August 1942.

The deployment of the Brazilian Expeditionary Force (FEB) to the front began in July 1944, almost two years after the declaration of war. About 25,000 men were sent out, out of the 100,000 expected. Despite problems in preparation and deployment, already in Italy, trained and equipped by the Americans, the FEB fulfilled the main missions assigned to it by the allied command. However, Brazil's participation in the war and the way it unfolded contributed decisively to the end of the Estado Novo regime.

Brazil's participation was more vigorous than the participation in World War I, considering the political and diplomatic game waged between Americans and Germans for Brazilian support, and the numbers of the real tactical and strategic contribution that the country provided compared to those of other allied countries (the FEB, for example, was one among 20 allied divisions in Italy, having acted in a sector, although relatively important, secondary in the Italian front, at a time when this very front had become of less importance to both sides. The still modest Brazilian participation in World War II can be equated to that of Japan in World War I. If on one hand, in numerical and tactical terms, the Brazilians had a greater participation in the Allied cause in the Second World War than the Japanese three decades earlier, on the other hand, the Japanese, between the 1920s and 1930s, were able to better capitalize politically and strategically at the international level on their participation in the 1914-18 conflict.

Air Force 

The support offered by Brazil to the allies through the 1st Fighter Aviation Group, created on December 18, 1943, was of great importance. After a training period in Aguadulce, Panama, flying the Curtiss P-40 Warhawk, where they participated in the Panama Canal defense campaign, the Brazilian pilots, all volunteers, went to Suffolk, where they were introduced to the P-47 Thunderbolt. Afterward, the group, which became known as Senta a Pua! was sent to northern Italy.

Operations began on October 31, 1944, at the Tarquinia airfield, then moved to Pisa, closer to action, where the Group remained until the end of the war, being subordinated to the 350th Fighter Group of the United States Army Air Forces (USAAF), where it received the codename "Jambock". On February 10, 1945, a squadron of the 1st G.Av.Ca. returning from a mission discovered a large concentration of trucks, destroying 80 of them and 3 buildings. On February 20, the Group helped the FEB in the conquest of Monte Castelo. On March 21, another victory, in the attack on a railroad repair shop, in the Po Valley: A direct hit destroyed four buildings and the return flight destroyed 3 Savoia-Marchetti SM.79, in the Galarate Field.

The Group initially consisted of 4 squadrons, in the colors red (letter A painted on the plane), yellow (B), blue (C), and green (D). Later, due to the large number of casualties in the yellow squadron, only three remained. The missions given to the Brazilians involved attacking bridges, ammunition depots, and transport vehicles. There were no problems regarding air superiority in this region, held by the Allies, the major concern being anti-aircraft artillery. Among the pilot officers who exercised aerial activities in the Group, a total of 48, there were 22 casualties, in addition to 4 more officers, victims of aviation accidents.

Attacks against Brazilian ships after the declaration of war 

A little over a month after the most tragic sinking, and less than a month after the declaration of war, three more ships would be targeted by the U-Boats: The Osório (5 dead), the Lajes (3 dead) and the Antonico (16 dead). The first two were torpedoed by the U-514 off Marajó Island; the third was sunk further north, off French Guiana, by the U-516. As a result of this act, at the end of the war, Brazil tried unsuccessfully to have the commander of the U-516, Captain lieutenant Gerhard Wiebe, and Lieutenant Markle, who fired shots at the shipwrecked men, extradited to Brazil for war crimes. The Porto Alegre was sunk on November 3, off the Indian coast of South Africa, with one fatality. The year would end with the sinking of the Apalóide on November 22, west of the Lesser Antilles, causing five more deaths.

The year 1943 began with good news to the Brazilians: The U-507, responsible for the August massacre of the previous year, had been sunk on January 13, in the Atlantic Ocean, about 100 miles off the coast of Ceará, by depth charges from a Catalina airplane, causing the death of all its 54 crew members. However, other ships would succumb to the other U-Boats still operating off the Brazilian coast. On February 18, it was the turn of the Brasilóide, torpedoed by the U-518 off the coast of Bahia. There were no fatalities in this sinking, but the following day, March 2, the war claimed the lives of 125 people aboard the Afonso Pena, sunk by the Italian submarine Barbarigo off Porto Seguro.

On the same day, the Natal Air Base (BANT) was created at the then Parnamirim Field, later known as "Trampolim da Vitória" ("Trampoline of Victory"). The activities of the Natal Air Base would only begin on August 7th of the same year.

Other Brazilian vessels hit during the war were:

 Tutoia, on the first of July (7 killed).
 Pelotaslóide (5 casualties), hit by the U-590 on the 4th of July.
 Shangri-la, on the 22nd of July (10 killed).
 Bagé, on the 31st of July (28 casualties).
 Itapagé, on the 26th of September (22 killed).
 Cisne Branco, on the following day (4 dead).
 Campos on the 23rd of October (12 dead).

By this time, the U-Boats were already suffering heavy casualties, not only on the Brazilian coasts but also in other places. In fact, in addition to the convoy system (the armament placed in merchant ships), the South Atlantic Force was created, with headquarters in Recife, as well as support bases in Natal and Fernando de Noronha. Air patrols began to be more effective at the end of December 1942, with American and FAB aircraft groups. The naval fleet was reinforced with the presence of American vessels. These patrols, allied with the deciphering of codes allowed results to be quickly harvested. The following year, Brazil still suffered the loss of the Vital de Oliveira, the only military ship sunk by enemy action in the war. The sinking, which occurred on July 20, 1944, off the coast of Rio de Janeiro, cost the lives of 99 people.

The German submarines sunk in the Brazilian territorial sea were U-590; U-662; U-507; U-164; U-598; U-591; U-128; U-161; U-199; U-513 and Archimede.

Post-war period 
According to historian Frank McCann, Brazil was invited to join the occupation force in Austria. However, as soon as the war ended, fearing a possible political capitalization of the Allied victory by members of the FEB, given its contribution to it, even if modest, the Brazilian government decided to officially demobilize it while still on Italian soil.

Restrictions were imposed on its members upon their return to the country, non-military veterans (who were discharged upon their return) were forbidden to wear decorations or expeditionary garments in public, while professional (military veterans) were transferred to frontier regions or far from major centers.

FEB Veterans Association 

From October 1945 on, the first Ex-Combatants Associations were formed. The non-planning by the Brazilian military authorities of the time, regarding a policy of assistance and social reintegration of its veterans, especially the vast majority of civilians without high professional qualifications, collaborated to the growth of such associations. From the disengagement of this objective from the public agency that had been created for the purpose (the Brazilian Legion of Assistance), they began to function as the only point of social support for veterans.

Between 1946 and 1950, there was a political dispute between communist and conservative veteran groups for leadership in the associations, which revolved around whether the associations should seek greater participation in national politics or stick to the immediate claims of veterans. It was won by the conservatives, with the support of the military leadership of the time, anticipating certain practices that would become standard in discussions of internal issues in the Army and other Armed Forces in the 1950s-1960s.

A pension for surviving veterans was established in 1988, with the 1988 Constituent Assembly, when all surviving Brazilian veterans of the Second World War became legally entitled to a special compensation, equivalent to the pension left by a second lieutenant in the army. This benefit not only extended to veterans who had not been in the Italian or Atlantic campaigns but did not differentiate between them and those who had served in continental Brazil during the war. The debate that preceded it, added to resentments accumulated over four decades, also served to increase the already existing feud between veterans who had active participation in the aforementioned campaigns and those who did not.

In the time between the end of the war and the granting of this pension, the veterans achieved small victories, such as access to the civil service for those who were not literate (which excluded a considerable number of veterans), and the construction of a Housing Complex for ex-combatants (in the Benfica neighborhood), in Rio de Janeiro, inaugurated at the beginning of the 1960s. Those who could not readapt to civilian life often became dependent on the associations.

See also 

 Brazil in World War I 
 Companhia Siderúrgica Nacional

Notes

References

Bibliography

Further reading 
 
 

World War II by country
Brazil in World War II
Brazilian Navy
Brazilian Air Force